is a professional Japanese baseball player. He is an outfielder for the Orix Buffaloes of Nippon Professional Baseball (NPB).

References 

1996 births
Living people
Nippon Professional Baseball outfielders
Baseball people from Ōita Prefecture
Orix Buffaloes players